The Fiji Pro 2017 was an event of the World Surf League for 2017 World Surf League.

This event was held from 07 to 19 June at Namotu, (Tavarua, Fiji) and opposed by 36 surfers.

Round 1

Round 2

Round 3

Round 4

Round 5

Quarter finals

Semi finals

Final

References

Fiji Pro
2017 World Surf League